Boninoleiops kitajimai is a species of beetle in the family Cerambycidae, and the only species in the genus Boninoleiops. It was described by Hasegawa and Makihara in 2001.

References

Acanthocinini
Beetles described in 2001
Monotypic Cerambycidae genera